Rudolf Pittrich (born 19 June 1935) is a German ice hockey player. He competed in the men's tournament at the 1956 Winter Olympics.

References

External links
 

1935 births
Living people
German ice hockey players
Olympic ice hockey players of the United Team of Germany
Ice hockey players at the 1956 Winter Olympics
Sportspeople from Garmisch-Partenkirchen